Remoray-Boujeons is a commune in the Doubs department in the Bourgogne-Franche-Comté region in Eastern France. In 2018, it had a population of 428.

Population

Gallery

See also
 Communes of the Doubs department

References

Communes of Doubs